Sandgate District State High School (SDSHS) is a secondary school located in Deagon, Brisbane, Queensland, Australia. Its motto is "Industria Floremus", which translates to "hard work brings success", or more literally "through industry we flourish". It educates grade levels seven to twelve.

It was opened in January 1959 but the first classes – five, A1, A2, B1, C1 and C2 were conducted in the Sandgate Town Hall, on the floor and on the stage, because the first school building (F block) was not yet ready for occupation.

Foundation students designed the school badge. Every part of the design has meaning. The motto "Industria Floremus" means "by industry we flourish, or more freely translated "hard work brings success". Latin was taught as a language in the early years of the school.

The shield and the boomerang (on which the motto is printed) indicate the association of early Sandgate with the Australian aborigines who roamed the area and featured in its early development.

The ibis, a common local bird, has also been associated with Sandgate since its early development. Early in the 21st century, local business people created from the letters of its name the rubric "I believe in Sandgate" (IBIS), a phrase often used in references to the school.

Notable alumni
Courtney Act (also known as Shane Jenek) – Australian Idol contestant and entertainer
 Jayson Bukuya – NRL player for the Cronulla-Sutherland Sharks and Fiji
 Murray Davis - AFL Assistant Coach (Brisbane Lions)
 Liam Dawson – AFL player
 Joseph Daye – AFL player
 Danny Dickfos – AFL player
Kerri-Anne Kennerley – Television presenter
 The Honourable Chief Justice Susan Kiefel – Chief Justice of the High Court of Australia (the highest court in the Australian court hierarchy)
Wendy Turnbull MBE – Tennis player

References

Public high schools in Brisbane